This article summarizes equations in the theory of gravitation.

Definitions

Gravitational mass and inertia

A common misconception occurs between centre of mass and centre of gravity.  They are defined in similar ways but are not exactly the same quantity. Centre of mass is the mathematical description of placing all the mass in the region considered to one position, centre of gravity is a real physical quantity, the point of a body where the gravitational force acts. They are equal if and only if the external gravitational field is uniform.

Newtonian gravitation

Gravitoelectromagnetism

In the weak-field and slow motion limit of general relativity, the phenomenon of gravitoelectromagnetism (in short "GEM") occurs, creating a parallel between gravitation and electromagnetism. The gravitational field is the analogue of the electric field, while the gravitomagnetic field, which results from circulations of masses due to their angular momentum, is the analogue of the magnetic field.

Equations

Newtonian gravitational fields

It can be shown that a uniform spherically symmetric mass distribution generates an equivalent gravitational field to a point mass, so all formulae for point masses apply to bodies which can be modelled in this way.

Gravitational potentials

General classical equations.

Weak-field relativistic equations

See also

Defining equation (physical chemistry)
Defining equation (physics)
List of electromagnetism equations
List of equations in classical mechanics
List of equations in nuclear and particle physics
List of equations in quantum mechanics
List of equations in wave theory
List of photonics equations
List of relativistic equations
Table of thermodynamic equations

Footnotes

Sources

Further reading

 
 
 
 

Physical quantities
SI units
Equations of physics
Gravity